Telemedia was a Canadian media company, which had holdings in radio, television and magazine publishing.

The company was launched in 1968 by Philippe de Gaspé Beaubien, when he purchased CKAC in Montreal from Power Corporation of Canada.  CKAC remained the company's radio flagship for its entire existence.

Telemedia was held privately until it became publicly traded in the late 1980s.

Telemedia's magazine assets, including Canadian Living, Harrowsmith, Homemakers and the Canadian editions of TV Guide and Elle, were sold to Transcontinental Media in 2000. Standard Broadcasting subsequently acquired Telemedia's broadcasting assets in 2002, and sold some of them in turn to Rogers Communications and Newcap Broadcasting.

Stations acquired by Standard
Through later transactions, almost all of these stations are now owned by Bell Media.

Ontario
 Hamilton - CHAM, CKLH, CKOC
 London - CKSL, CJBK, CJBX, CIQM
 Pembroke - CHVR
 St. Catharines - CHRE, CHTZ, CKTB 
 Toronto - CHBM, CKFM, CFRB

British Columbia
 Dawson Creek - CJDC, CJDC-TV
 Fort Nelson - CKRX
 Fort St. John - CKNL, CHRX
 Golden - CKGR
 Kelowna - CKBL, CHSU
 Kitimat - CKTK
 Nelson - CKKC
 Osoyoos - CJOR
 Penticton - CJMG, CKOR
 Prince Rupert - CHTK
 Princeton - CIOR
 Revelstoke - CKCR
 Salmon Arm - CKXR
 Summerland - CHOR
 Terrace - CFTK, CFTK-TV, CJFW
 Trail - CJAT
 Vernon - CICF

Alberta

 Edmonton - CFMG

Stations acquired by Rogers
All of the stations that were acquired by Rogers are located in Ontario. Two of the stations have since been sold to other companies.

 North Bay - CHUR, CKAT, CKFX
 Sault Ste. Marie - CHAS, CJQM
 Sudbury - CJMX, CJRQ
 Timmins - CJQQ, CKGB
 Toronto - CJCL

Former stations
Stations formerly owned by Rogers have now since been sold to other companies:

 Sudbury - CIGM
 Orillia - CICX

Stations acquired by Newcap

Although Newcap acquired the majority interest in these stations, all of which are in Alberta, Standard Broadcasting retained a 23.66% share. All are now wholly owned by Newcap.
  	
Athabasca - CKBA
Blairmore - CJPR
Brooks - CIBQ
Calgary - CIQX 1
Drumheller - CKDQ
Edson - CFXE
Grand Centre - CJCM
High Prairie - CKVH
Hinton - CIYR
St. Paul - CHLW
Slave Lake - CKWA
Stettler - CKSQ
Wainwright - CKKY
Westlock - CFOK
Wetaskiwin - CKJR

NOTES: 1 Telemedia held the license for this station, which had not yet launched at the time of its acquisition.

Stations in Quebec
All Telemedia stations in Quebec were acquired by Astral Media, although the Radiomédia network of mainly AM stations became a 50/50 joint venture between Astral Media and Standard Broadcasting. Corus Entertainment acquired Radiomédia by 2005 in exchange for Corus's smaller FM stations in Quebec. Astral re-entered the AM business in Quebec by 2007, when Standard Broadcasting exited the terrestrial broadcasting business as Astral acquired the stations.

External links
Telemedia Communications (1968-2002) - Canadian Communications Foundation

Radio broadcasting companies of Canada
Magazine publishing companies of Canada
Defunct broadcasting companies of Canada
Mass media companies established in 1968
Mass media companies disestablished in 2002
1968 establishments in Quebec
2002 disestablishments in Quebec